The Czech Republic women's national baseball team is the national baseball team of the Czech Republic. The team competes in the bi-annual Women's European Baseball Championship. In the 2022 the team finished runners up in the European Championships, behind France.

References

National baseball teams in Europe
Baseball in the Czech Republic
baseball